Mizu gumo was a water crossing device used by ninja. In one description a device was worn like a harness around the hips and had small air pockets to keep the ninja afloat. Another description says that two were used and worn like shoes. The pockets were usually made of animal hide.

In an episode of MythBusters, another mizu gumo made of wood and rope which was attached to the feet was tested.  This was deemed to be 'busted' for walking on water, though possibly effective for rice paddies or marshy areas.

See also
 Mizugumo Monmon

External links
https://web.archive.org/web/20090928050527/http://www.entertheninja.com/fact_tools.php

Ninjutsu artefacts
Buoyancy devices